|}

The Dahlbury Handicap Chase is a Premier Handicap National Hunt steeplechase in Great Britain which is open to horses aged four years or older. It is run on the New Course at Cheltenham over a distance of about 3 miles and 2 furlongs (5,230 metres). It is a handicap race, and is scheduled to take place each year in December.

The race was first run in 2003 and was awarded Grade 3 status in 2011. It has been run under various sponsored titles during its history. It was re-classified as a Premier Handicap from the 2022 running when Grade 3 status was renamed by the BHA.

Records
Most successful horse (2 wins):
 Cogry – 2018, 2019

Leading jockey (2 wins):
 Timmy Murphy – 	Therealbandit (2004), The Package (2009)
 Tom Scudamore – Master Overseer (2012), Monbeg Dude (2013)
 Charlie Deutsch -  Aachen (2015), Commodore (2021) 
 Sam Twiston-Davies -  Cogry (2018, 2019)

Leading trainer (3 wins):
 David Pipe – Over The Creek (2007), The Package (2009), Master Overseer (2012) Venetia Williams -  Mon Mome (2008), Aachen (2015), Commodore (2021) ''

Winners

See also
 Horse racing in Great Britain
 List of British National Hunt races

References

Racing Post:

Cheltenham Racecourse
National Hunt chases
National Hunt races in Great Britain
Recurring sporting events established in 2003
2003 establishments in England